Aschamalmite is a mineral with the chemical formula PbBiS. Its type locality is the High Tauern in Austria.

References

External links 

 Aschamalmite data sheet
 Aschamalmite on the Handbook of Mineralogy

Lead minerals
Bismuth minerals
Sulfur(−II) compounds